Ben 10: Galactic Racing is a racing video game in the Ben 10 series, produced for PlayStation 3, Xbox 360, Wii, Nintendo DS, PlayStation Vita, and Nintendo 3DS. It was released in North America on October 18, 2011, and November 25, 2011, in Europe, for the Wii, PlayStation 3, Xbox 360, Nintendo DS and Nintendo 3DS. The PlayStation Vita port of Ben 10: Galactic Racing was released on February 22, 2012, in North America and March 16, 2012, in Europe. It is published by D3 Publisher and developed by Monkey Bar Games. It was announced at Electronic Entertainment Expo 2011 on June 7, 2011. While players can enable Ben's alien forms in mid-race, other characters such as Kevin Levin can utilize their unique special abilities to affect the outcome of a race. All playable characters can pick up special Omni-Node Power-Ups with many different types of alien-based abilities, including a special Ultimate move that unleashes a super boost of speed and power. Races are held in Galactic Grand Prix circuits, and players can set record-breaking time scores that can be set in Time Trials mode. A new alien, Fasttrack, made his video game debut on every platform and one of Ben's original aliens, Diamondhead was made exclusively available on the Nintendo DS version. This is the first Ben 10 game that's not available on the PlayStation Portable and the PlayStation 2, and the first Ben 10 game in which the player can play as Vilgax.

Gameplay

Gameplay has been cited to be similar to Nintendo's 2008 and 2014 games Mario Kart Wii and Mario Kart 8 , with characters racing through various race circuits based on different places across the Ben 10 franchise, and collecting power-ups (called Omni-Nodes) to boost their speed or hamper their opponents. The game features different types of stages or modes. Featuring: The Galactic Grand Prix (racing in several multi-tracks to unlock characters and win trophies), Short Circuit (racing on a custom prix consisting of three tracks), Single Race (racing on any track), Time Trials (beat times set by players and where players unlock karts), Showdown (three bonus games consisting of Ultimate Alienation, Omni-Tag and Ultimate Elimination) and Multiplayer (a mode that includes up to four players who race against each other.)

Reception

Ben 10: Galactic Racing received mixed reviews from critics.

References

2011 video games
Ben 10
D3 Publisher games
Kart racing video games
Multiplayer and single-player video games
Nintendo 3DS games
Nintendo DS games
PlayStation 3 games
PlayStation Vita games
Superhero video games
Video games based on Ben 10
Video games developed in the United States
Video games scored by Rod Abernethy
Wii games
Wii Wheel games
Xbox 360 games
Cartoon Network video games
Tantalus Media games
Monkey Bar Games games